Onai Malik (born Onaza Malik), known professionally as Nadia Ali, is a Pakistani-born American former pornographic actress, who worked as an adult actress from 2015 to 2016.

Early life
Ali was born in Pakistan in 1991 or 1992 as Onaza Malik. She emigrated to the United States as a child and was raised in New Jersey. She now uses the name Onai Malik. She felt isolated by her family's conservatism although she did not wear a hijab. She was raised as a Muslim and in an interview in July 2016 with Refinery29, she stated that still identified herself as a practicing Muslim. She prays two to three times a day, and said "I kind of have an internal conflict sometimes. One of the biggest main sins it’s hard to be forgiven for is adultery — having sex without marriage is a sin and doing it multiple times a day as an escort is one of the major sins that you will not be forgiven for, and I am fully aware of that, but yeah, I still pray."

Career

Pornographic career
In 2013, 21-year-old Ali was working as an eyebrow threader in San Francisco when a friend recommended that she accompany her as a stripper; she made $500 that night and worked as a dancer and escort in 2014.

She was encouraged to wear a hijab in pornography due to sexual taboo and to increase her opportunities. One of her films, titled Women of the Middle East, involves a domestic violence scene followed by a sex scene, when the man becomes aroused. Its advertising blurb reads: "They may look suppressed, but given an opportunity to express themselves freely, their wild, untamable natural sexuality is released." She blames culture, rather than religion, for patriarchy in Pakistan and has said she wanted to make solo and lesbian scenes to "show the world that Middle Eastern girls of Pakistani descent really do get horny." She has said that she has been "banned" from Pakistan for performing in pornography in a hijab, and also has received online death-threats for performing.

In 2016, she left the pornographic industry after making twenty scenes, when her mother discovered she was doing porn and became depressed. She also stated that she found the idea of her 21st film, of a man resembling Donald Trump having sex with a Muslim woman, to be degrading. Her bookings to perform in Florida after the 2016 Pulse Orlando shooting were canceled for fear of backlash.

Other ventures

Ali now works as a cosmetologist. In July 2018, she opened her beauty bar, Onai Here 2 Slay, in Los Angeles, California.

References

External links
 
 
 
 

Year of birth missing (living people)
Living people
American people of Pakistani descent
American pornographic film actresses
American Muslims
Actresses from New Jersey
Actresses from San Francisco
Pakistani pornographic film actresses
21st-century American actresses